The 2020 Louisiana Ragin' Cajuns football team represented the University of Louisiana at Lafayette in the 2020 NCAA Division I FBS football season. The Ragin' Cajuns played their home games at Cajun Field in Lafayette, Louisiana, and competed in the West Division of the Sun Belt Conference. They were led by third-year head coach Billy Napier. The Cajuns began the season with an away matchup against a preseason top-25 Iowa State and concluded their regular season at conference and in-state rival Louisiana–Monroe.

Shortly before the season began, Offensive Line Assistant Coach D. J. Looney, 31, died of a heart attack while at practice on August 1, 2020.  He was honored at the Week 9 matchup against UAB in his hometown of Birmingham, Alabama, where players all wore Looney's name on their jerseys.

The win over Iowa State marked the first victory against a ranked team on the road in team history, the second victory ever against a ranked team, and the highest ranked team ever defeated. The following week, the Cajuns were nationally ranked for the first time since the 1940s, reaching 19th in the AP Poll. During their Week 2 overtime victory against Georgia State, the Cajuns secured their first victory in overtime since the 2005 conference matchup against the Troy Trojans. During Week 14, Louisiana was ranked for the first time ever in the College Football Playoff rankings, at No. 25. This was also the first time the Cajuns had been ranked in the three major college football rankings (No. in the 20 AP Poll, No. 21 in the Coaches Poll, and No. 25 in the CFP rankings). During Week 14, the Cajuns defeated Appalachian State for the first time in school history, bringing their all-time record against the Mountaineers to 1–8.

The Cajuns ended their season by defeating the UTSA Roadrunners in the 2020 First Responder Bowl. Senior RB Elijah Mitchell earned the bowl game MVP. This also marked the first time a Sun Belt team took part in that bowl game.

Previous season
The Ragin' Cajuns finished the 2019 season 11–3, 7–1 in Sun Belt play to finish in first place in the West Division for the second consecutive year in the Sun Belt Conference. The Ragin' Cajuns then played in the Sun Belt Conference Championship Game, losing to Appalachian State 38–45. The Cajuns, finishing second overall in the Sun Belt, were invited to play in the LendingTree Bowl, their first time taking part in the annual Mobile, Alabama bowl game. They played Miami, OH and won their third overall bowl game by the score of  27–17.  For the first time in decades, the Cajuns received upwards of 26 votes in the USA Today Coaches Poll and 2 in the AP Poll.

Preseason

Recruiting class

|}

Award watch lists
Listed in the order that they were released

Preseason

References:

Season/Postseason

References:

Sun Belt coaches poll
The Sun Belt coaches poll was released on August 25, 2020. The Cajuns were picked to finish first in the West with 47 votes and second in the conference behind Appalachian State.

Sun Belt Preseason All-Conference teams

Offense

1st team
Elijah Mitchell (LA, SR, Running Back)

2nd team
Levi Lewis (LA, SR, Quarterback)
Trey Ragas (LA, R-SR, Running Back)
Max Mitchell (LA, JR, Offensive Lineman)
O'Cyrus Torrence (LA, SO, Offensive Lineman)

Defense

1st team
Joe Dillon (LA, R-SR, Linebacker)

2nd team
Zi'Yon Hill (LA, R-JR, Defensive Lineman)
Eric Garror (LA, JR, Cornerback)

Special teams

1st team
Rhys Burns (LA, JR, Punter)

2nd teams
Eric Garror (LA, JR, Return Specialist)

Athlon Sports Sun Belt Preseason All-Conference teams

Offense

1st team
Elijah Mitchell – SR, running back
Max Mitchell – JR, offensive line
2nd team
Levi Lewis – SR, quarterback
Trey Ragas – R-SR, running back
3rd team
O'Cyrus Torrence – SO, offensive line
4th team
Jamal Bell – SR, wide receiver
Shane Vallot – R-JR, offensive line

Defense

1st team
Joe Dillon – R-SR, linebacker
2nd team
Zi'Yon Hill – R-JR, defensive line
Percy Butler – JR, Safety
3rd team
Chauncey Manac – R-SR, linebacker 
Eric Garror – JR, cornerback
4th team
Kris Moncrief – JR, linebacker
Asjlin Washington – JR, cornerback
Kam Pedescleaux – R-SO, safety

Special teams

1st team
Rhys Burns – JR, punter
Eric Garror – JR, return specialist

References:

Lindy's Sports Sun Belt Preseason All-Conference teams
During the announcement, Lindy's also picked the Cajuns to win their third-consecutive Sun Belt West Division Championship as well as named Senior running back Elijah Mitchell to the Preseason Sun Belt Offensive Player of the Year.

Offense

1st team
Elijah Mitchell – SR, running back

2nd team
Levi Lewis – SR, quarterback
Trey Ragas – R-SR, running back

Defense

1st team
Joe Dillon – R-SR, linebacker
2nd team
Zi'Yon Hill – R-JR, defensive line

Special teams

1st team
Rhys Burns – JR, punter

References:

Personnel

Schedule
The 2020 schedule consists of 6 home and 6 away games in the regular season. The Ragin' Cajuns will travel to Sun Belt foes Appalachian State, Georgia State, Texas State and Louisiana–Monroe. The Cajuns will play host to Sun Belt foes Georgia Southern, Coastal Carolina, Arkansas State, and South Alabama.

The Ragin' Cajuns will host one of the three non-conference opponents at Cajun Field, Central Arkansas, from NCAA Division I FCS, and will travel to Iowa State of the Big 12 and UAB of the C-USA.

Louisiana had a game against Missouri and Wyoming, which were canceled due to the COVID-19 pandemic.

On August 12, the Cajuns and Iowa State reached an agreement to play each other. This game will replace the Cajuns' Wyoming game that was canceled.

On August 13, New Mexico State decided to postpone all their fall sports to the spring.  This canceled their October 23 contest with Louisiana.

On August 17, McNeese pulled out of the agreement to play Louisiana in the Herbert Heymann Classic on September 5.

On August 20, the Cajuns reached agreements with UAB and Central Arkansas to play them away on October 23 and home on November 21, respectively.Schedule Source:'

Game summaries

At Iowa State

at Georgia State

Georgia Southern

Coastal Carolina

at UAB

at Texas State

Arkansas State

South Alabama

at Louisiana–Monroe

at Appalachian State

vs. UTSA (First Responder Bowl)

Postseason Accolade

Rankings

Players drafted into the NFL

Notes
1. Many games during the 2020 season denoted “0” in attendance due to COVID-19 pandemic regulations. See Impacts of the COVID-19 pandemic.

References

Louisiana
Louisiana Ragin' Cajuns football seasons
Sun Belt Conference football champion seasons
First Responder Bowl champion seasons
Louisiana Ragin' Cajuns football